García or Garcia may refer to:

People 
 García (surname)
 Kings of Pamplona/Navarre
 García Íñiguez of Pamplona, king of Pamplona 851/2–882
 García Sánchez I of Pamplona, king of Pamplona 931–970
 García Sánchez II of Pamplona, king of Pamplona 994–1004
 García Sánchez III of Navarre, king of Navarre 1035–1054
 García Ramírez of Navarre, king of Navarre 1134–1150
 Kings of León/Galicia
 García I of León
 García II of Galicia

Places 
 Garcia, Tarragona, a municipality in Ribera d'Ebre, Spain
 García, Nuevo León, a municipality in Mexico
 Garcia, Colorado, an unincorporated town in the United States

Entertainment
 Los tres García, Mexican film from the Golden Age of cinema

Television
 Los Garcia, Puerto Rican television comedy show the 1970s
 The Garcias, American television series 
 García!, Spanish television series

Music
 Garcia (album), an album by Jerry Garcia
 Garcia (band), a German Eurodance project

Military
 USS Garcia (FF-1040), U.S. Navy frigate
 Garcia-class frigate, of the U.S. Navy

Other uses 
 Garcia (plant), a plant genus of the family Euphorbiaceae
 Garcia v. San Antonio Metropolitan Transit Authority, a US Supreme Court case

See also 

 Garcia Hernandez, Bohol, municipality in the province of Bohol, Philippines
 Padre Garcia, Batangas, municipality in the province of Batangas, Philippines
 San Pedro Garza García, suburb of Monterrey, Nuevo León, Mexico
 Diego Garcia, an atoll in the Indian Ocean used as a major military base by the United States